Here is a list of mayors of Atlanta, Georgia. The mayor is the highest elected official in Atlanta. Since its incorporation in 1847, the city has had 61 mayors. The current mayor is Andre Dickens who was elected in the 2021 election and took office in January, 2022.

The term of office was one year until Cicero C. Hammock's second term (1875–77), when a new city charter changed it to two years.  The term was changed to four years in 1929, giving Isaac N. Ragsdale the modern stay in office.  Though a political party is listed where known, the mayoral election is officially non-partisan, so candidates do not represent their party when elected.  In recent history, the viable candidates in the race have primarily been Democrats.

List
See the mayors of Atlanta category for an alphabetical list.

Every mayor has been African American since 1974.

Acting mayors

See also
 Timeline of Atlanta

References

 
Atlanta
Mayors